Khoshkeh Rud (also Romanized as Khoshkeh Rūd; also known as Khoshk Rūd, Rūd Khoshkeh, and Rūd-e Khoshk) is a village in Beyranvand-e Shomali Rural District, Bayravand District, Khorramabad County, Lorestan Province, Iran. At the 2006 census, its population was 102, in 23 families.

References 

Towns and villages in Khorramabad County